Psammomys is a genus of rodents in the family Muridae.

The complete nuclear DNA genome of one Psamomys species, P. obesus, has been sequenced in 2017.

It contains the following species:
 Fat sand rat, Psammomys obesus
 Thin sand rat, Psammomys vexillaris

References

 
Rodent genera
Taxa named by Philipp Jakob Cretzschmar
Taxonomy articles created by Polbot